In enzymology, a diaminobutyrate-2-oxoglutarate transaminase is an enzyme that catalyzes the chemical reaction

L-2,4-diaminobutanoate + 2-oxoglutarate  L-aspartate 4-semialdehyde + L-glutamate

Thus, the two substrates of this enzyme are L-2,4-diaminobutanoate and 2-oxoglutarate, whereas its two products are L-aspartate 4-semialdehyde and L-glutamate.

This enzyme belongs to the family of transferases, specifically the transaminases, which transfer nitrogenous groups.  The systematic name of this enzyme class is L-2,4-diaminobutanoate:2-oxoglutarate 4-aminotransferase. Other names in common use include L-2,4-diaminobutyrate:2-ketoglutarate 4-aminotransferase, 2,4-diaminobutyrate 4-aminotransferase, diaminobutyrate aminotransferase, DABA aminotransferase, DAB aminotransferase, EctB, diaminibutyric acid aminotransferase, and L-2,4-diaminobutyrate:2-oxoglutarate 4-aminotransferase.  This enzyme participates in glycine, serine and threonine metabolism.

References

 
 
 
 
 
 

EC 2.6.1
Enzymes of unknown structure